Zhu Yawen (born April 1984) is a Chinese actor. He appeared in the films The Witness and The Founding of an Army; and the television series Red Sorghum and Empress of the Ming. In 2018, he took part in variety show The Sound and became champion.
In 2019, he joined the variety show Keep Running as a cast member.

Zhu ranked 80th on Forbes China Celebrity 100 list in 2019.

Early life
Born on 21 April 1984, Zhu attended Beijing Film Academy.

Personal life
Zhu married Shen Jiani in 2016. They have two children together.

Career
Zhu rose to fame for his role in the 2006 war drama Pathfinding to the Northeast. The drama was critically acclaimed, and received the Golden Eagle Award for Best Television Series (China) and the Flying Apsaras Award for Outstanding Television Series.

This was followed with a leading role in another war drama The Ultimate Master of War in 2009, which established his popularity in China. The same year, he starred in the military drama Great Northern Wilderness, which received the Flying Apsaras Awards for Outstanding Television Series.

In 2010, Zhu starred in the romance drama Army Stories in Highland and received acclaim for his performance.

In 2011, Zhu was awarded the Asian New Talent award at the Shanghai International Film Festival.

In 2012, Zhu was nominated at the International Emmy Award for his performance in the aviation war drama Flying Eagle.

In 2014, Zhu starred alongside Zhou Xun in the television adaptation of Red Sorghum by Mo Yan. However, his portrayal of the male lead Yu Zhan'ao, was criticized as stiff and unnatural. The same year, he featured in the biographical film The Golden Era directed by Ann Hui, playing the role of Duanmu Hongliang.

In 2015, Zhu starred alongside Ma Yili in Swan Dive for Love, a modern drama which narrates the story of a white-collar couple striving to make themselves richer amid a series of challenges. Zhu won the Best Actor award in the contemporary drama category for his performance. The same year, he played the antagonist in crime thriller The Witness.

In 2019, Zhu starred in the historical drama Empress of the Ming, portraying Zhu Zhanji.

Filmography

Film

Television series

Variety show

Discography

Singles

Awards and nominations

References

External links
 Zhu Yawen on Sina Weibo
 Zhu Yawen at filmaffinity.com
 Zhu Yawen at hkmdb.com

1984 births
Living people
Male actors from Jiangsu
People from Yancheng
21st-century Chinese male actors
Chinese male television actors
Chinese male film actors
Beijing Film Academy alumni